H. Gregory Wittman (born May 10, 1947) is an American former professional basketball player. He played in the American Basketball Association for three teams during the 1969–70 and 1970–71 seasons. In his ABA career, Wittman scored 212 points.

References

1947 births
Living people
Basketball players from North Carolina
Denver Rockets draft picks
Denver Rockets players
Miami Floridians players
Power forwards (basketball)
People from Rockingham, North Carolina
Seattle SuperSonics draft picks
Texas Chaparrals players
Western Carolina Catamounts men's basketball players
American men's basketball players